The Ramsar Palace or Marmar Palace is one of the historic buildings and royal residences in Iran. The palace is in Ramsar, a city on the coast of the Caspian Sea.

History
The Ramsar Palace was established on a land of 60,000 square meters in 1937. The area was a historical garden in Ramsar. Crown Prince Mohammad Reza Pahlavi's companion Ernest Perron was sent to the palace to work as the head gardener shortly after the completion of the construction.

The palace was used as a summer residence by Reza Shah and then by his son, Mohammad Reza Pahlavi. Mohammad Reza Pahlavi and his second spouse Sorayya Esfendiari spent their honeymoon in the palace. They also frequently went there when they came across political crisis in Tehran.

Technical features

The Ramsar Palace is a compact and modest residence with  square meters area although it lies on a land of 60,000 square meters. It is a rectangular building with a single story, and is decorated with works by famous Iranian sculptors and painters. The front line of the palace is made up of carved marble stones which were made by local artists. The common materials used are plaster and mirror in addition to marble. There is a reception hall or central hall in the place which has wooden floor.

Current usage
The palace has been used as a museum since 2000. It is called the Ramsar Palace museum or the Caspian museum and is known by locals as “Tamashagah Khazar".

References

External links

1937 establishments in Iran
Architecture in Iran
Buildings and structures in Mazandaran Province
Historic house museums in Iran
Houses completed in 1937
Museums established in 2000
National museums of Iran
Palaces in Iran
Royal residences in Iran
Tourist attractions in Mazandaran Province